Thomas Francis Tickner (1864-1924) was a British architect.

Early life
Thomas Francis Tickner was born in 1864.

Career
Tickner was an architect. He designed The Biggin Hall Hotel, a Grade II listed public house at 214 Binley Road, Coventry, CV3 1HG. It was built in 1921-23 for Marston, Thompson & Evershed, and was Grade II listed in 2015 by Historic England.

It was finished in 1927.

Death
Tickner died in 1924.

References

1864 births
1924 deaths
Architects from Warwickshire
Public house architects